In the Whyte notation, a 6-2-0 is a railroad steam locomotive that has an unpowered three-axle leading truck followed by a single powered driving axle.  This wheel arrangement is associated with the Crampton locomotive type, and in the USA the single class were sometimes referred to as Cramptons.

Other equivalent classifications are:
UIC classification: 3A (also known as German classification and Italian classification)
French classification: 310
Turkish classification: 14
Swiss classification: 1/4

History
The 6-2-0 was a most unusual wheel arrangement, where the bulk of the locomotive's weight was on the unpowered leading wheels rather than the powered driving wheels, therefore giving poor adhesion. The type was only practicable on the Crampton locomotive with a low boiler and large driving wheels placed behind the firebox.

United Kingdom
The only British 6-2-0 was the locomotive Liverpool built in 1848 by Bury, Curtis, and Kennedy for the London and North Western Railway. It was exhibited at The Great Exhibition in 1851 but was only moderately successful and no more were built.

United States
On a trip to England, Robert L. Stevens, president of the Camden and Amboy (C&A) railroad, saw 6-2-0 demonstrations on the railways there.  When he returned in 1848, Stevens asked his master mechanic Isaac Dripps to build him a 6-2-0 for use on the C&A.  The specifications for the first 6-2-0 included a 38" diameter boiler that would burn anthracite coal and 96" diameter driving wheels.

Designing the locomotive type to burn coal, which was still fairly expensive and difficult to come by, was unusual for the time.  The great majority of locomotives of the 1830s and 1840s were built to burn wood, which was very plentiful, cheap and exceptionally easy to obtain along the railroad rights of way.  Besides being more expensive, coal required a larger firebox in which to burn.  Dripps rose to the challenge and created an operable design.

The first of three locomotives based on these specifications, named John Stevens, was completed in 1849.  Dripps wasn't too sure that the locomotive would prove effective on American railroads, and his reservations turned out to be correct. The locomotive's tractive effort was not sufficient for long term or heavy work. With only one driving axle and three unpowered leading axles, too much of the locomotive's weight was distributed over the unpowered lead three axles. Almost a century passed before a six-wheel leading truck was used again, on the PRR S1 and S2.

The C&A's management, on the other hand, thought it performed admirably enough to order two more of them and place them in passenger service.  It was claimed that they could reach 60 m.p.h. at a time when fast trains reached only 40 m.p.h.  The 6-2-0s were later rebuilt to 4-4-0s and were in use as late as 1865.

References

 
 John Stevens history

2,6-2-0